Bathmochoffatia is an extinct mammal of the Upper Jurassic. It was a relatively early member of the also extinct order Multituberculata. It lived in Portugal at about the same time as the far more famous dinosaur, Allosaurus. It is in the suborder "Plagiaulacida", family Paulchoffatiidae. The genus Bathmochoffatia (basal choffatia) was named by Hahn G. and Hahn R. in 1998.

The primary species, Bathmochoffatia hapax, was also named by Hahn and Hahn.
Fossil remains were found in strata dating to the Kimmeridgian (Upper Jurassic) of Guimarota, Portugal. Remains consist of a solitary molar and one cheek tooth.

References
 Hahn & Hahn 1998), "Neue Beobachtungen an Plagiaulacoidea (Multituberculata) des Ober-Jura". 3. Der Bau der Molaren bei den Paulchoffatiidae. Berliner Geowissenschaftliche Abhandlungen, E, 28, p. 39-84. (New observations on Plagiaulacoidea (Multituberculata) of the Upper Jurassic. 3. The construction of the molars of Paulchoffatiidae.)
 Hahn G & Hahn R (2000), Multituberculates from the Guimarota mine, p. 97-107 in Martin T & Krebs B (eds), Guimarota - A Jurassic Ecosystem, Verlag Dr Friedrich Pfeil, München.
 Kielan-Jaworowska Z & Hurum JH (2001), "Phylogeny and Systematics of multituberculate mammals". Paleontology 44, p. 389-429.
 Much of this information has been derived from  Multituberculata Cope, 1884.

Late Jurassic mammals of Europe
Multituberculates
Prehistoric mammal genera
Fossil taxa described in 1998